The Universidad Abierta y a Distancia de México, (UnADM), (Open and Distance University of Mexico), is a Mexican institution of higher education specialized in the open and distance modality, with public and free status, deconcentrated from the Secretariat of Public Education and decreed as a university on January 19, 2012 in the Official Journal of the Federation,  from the Program ESAD, which was developed to begin operating in 2009.

UnADM is the first non-profit, tuition-free, accredited, online, Americas university. Its headquarters are located in Distrito Federal, and its rector is directly elected by the President of the Republic. It is empowered to issue college certificates, undergraduate and graduate major degrees to those who have completed higher education in accordance with their plans and programs.
The professional title is granted through the approval of a public dissertation, in which is exposed and defended an original project that was developed through professional stays at the end of the career.

All the courses are taught via the Internet, taking advantage of the technological tools of communication. The programs of the different majors are divided into semesters, each of which consists of two blocks, formed by three courses each.
The modular curricular model allows obtaining a Técnico Superior Universitario title (Higher University Technician - similar to an associate degree), after having completed the first two years, and a Licenciatura title (bachelor degree), at the end of four years.

Programs

References

External links
Official website

Distance education institutions based in Mexico
Public universities and colleges in Mexico